Colonel William Polk (9 July 1758 – 14 January 1834) was a North Carolina banker, educational administrator, political leader, renowned Continental officer in the War for American Independence, and survivor of the 1777/1778 encampment at Valley Forge.

Early life and background
William Polk was born in Mecklenburg County, North Carolina, on July 9, 1758, the eldest child of Thomas Polk and his wife Sussana Spratt. From the earliest days of rebellion against British authority, Mecklenburg had been a hotbed of revolutionary fervor, and the Polk family was very active in this cause. William's father was commander of the local militia, a rumored key player in adoption of the Mecklenburg Resolves of May 31, 1775, and later colonel of the 4th North Carolina Regiment, Continental Line.

Following their father's example, three of Thomas Polk's sons served as officers in the war against the British. The younger Thomas was killed in action serving alongside his brother William at the Battle of Eutaw Springs.

American Revolutionary War
 At the onset of military action between the American colonies and Great Britain, William Polk left Queens College (an unrelated precursor of the modern Queens University) to accept a commission as second lieutenant in his uncle Ezekiel Polk's company of the Third South Carolina Regiment, commanded by Col. William Thomson. In a campaign to subdue Tory forces in South Carolina, he was severely wounded in the left shoulder at Great Cane Brake on 23 December 1775. Borne on a litter 120 miles to his father's home in North Carolina, he spent the following nine months recuperating from the dangerously infected wound. His reportedly was the first American blood shed south of Lexington and Concord, Massachusetts.
1776, November 26: The Provincial Congress of North Carolina at Halifax elected young Polk major of the 9th North Carolina Regiment, North Carolina Continental Line. When the North Carolina regiments were ordered north, the Ninth had only about half its complement of men, and its colonel and lieutenant colonel remained in North Carolina to superintend further recruiting. Polk, a combat veteran of imposing stature—he stood six feet, four <ref>Mary Jones Polk Branch, "Memoirs of a Southern Woman," Branch Publishing, Chicago, 1912, p. 83.</ref>—was given command and marched the regiment to Maryland for inoculation against smallpox, then to Trenton, N.J., where it joined the main body of General Washington's army.
1777, September 11: Polk and his regiment saw action at the Battle of Brandywine.
1777, October 4: At the Battle of Germantown Polk was shot in the mouth while in the act of giving a command. The musket ball ranged along the upper jaw, knocking out four teeth and shattering the jawbone.
1777/1778, winter: Recuperating from this wound, Polk remained with his regiment during the  difficult encampment at Valley Forge.
1778, March: Their ranks severely depleted by death and the expiration of enlistments, North Carolina's ten regiments were reduced to four. Superfluous officers, including Polk, were removed by lot from active service. Polk returned to North Carolina, where he engaged in recruiting duty.
1778, fall – 1780, April: Polk continued in his recruiting duties and participated in skirmishes against the Tories.
1780, May: After the fall of Charleston, the Southern Department of the army was reorganized under General Horatio Gates. Polk was assigned as an aide to Major General Richard Caswell at the Battle of Camden, the former governor of North Carolina.
1780: Polk saw action at the disastrous Battle of Camden. When the Continentals began to give ground, Polk joined with the North Carolina militia and fought with them. Once De Kalb fell and the rout of Continentals was complete, Polk was able to lead a large number of troops in a successful retreat to North Carolina. That fall he acquired a position under General William Davidson.
1781, January: General Davidson's militia, including Polk, marched to the aid of Daniel Morgan, who after his success at Cowpens was on the run from the main body of Cornwallis's army.
1781, February - April: When Cornwallis attempted to cross the Catawba at Cowan's Ford, he was attacked by Davidson's militia. Polk was riding alongside Davidson when the general was shot from his horse and killed instantly. Word of Davidson's death spread quickly, and the demoralized militia broke in the face of an enemy bayonet charge. Polk rallied the few men he could and led them to Salem, reporting for service to General Andrew Pickens, with whom he remained until, following the Battle of Guilford Court House, Pickens left the army of General Nathanael Greene. Soon thereafter Polk was commissioned lieutenant colonel by Governor John Rutledge of South Carolina and took command of the 4th and then the 3rd regiments of that state, mustering his regiment under the command of General Thomas Sumter. Less than a month after being commissioned, Polk, together with troops under Colonel Wade Hampton, grandfather of the Confederate general of that name, led his regiment on a forced march of sixty miles in seventeen hours, surprising the British at Friday's Ferry on the Congaree and burning the blockhouse near Fort Granby, South Carolina.
1781, May 11–15: Polk joined General Greene at Fort Motte, which capitulated on the second day of a siege, and then marched under General Sumter's command to Orangeburg, where the British garrison quickly surrendered.
1781, July. Polk's regiment invested the British garrison around Watboo Church, burning bridges and causeways, then retired to await the arrival of Sumter's artillery. In the morning the British cavalry made "a furious charge," but were thrown back. That night the British abandoned their position, burned the church and other buildings and retreated to Quinby Bridge, where they were saved from certain defeat by Sumter's failure to employ his artillery.
1781, September 8: Polk's regiment covered the left wing of the American army under General Nathanael Greene at the Battle of Eutaw Springs. While charging the enemy, Polk's horse was shot dead and fell on top of him, pinning him to the ground. A British soldier was in the act of plunging a bayonet into Polk when he was cut down by a sergeant in Polk's regiment. (Polk's brother Lieutenant Thomas Polk was killed during the battle.) With regard to Colonel Polk's performance that day, Greene wrote in his official report:

Lieutenant-Colonels Polk and Middleton were no less conspicuous for their good conduct than their intrepidity, and the troops under their command gave a specimen of what may be expected from men naturally brave when improved by proper discipline.

Eutaw Springs was the last major battle in the South prior to Yorktown and was Polk's final military engagement. With the end of hostilities, Polk returned to North Carolina, a veteran of some of the Revolution's  fiercest battles and a survivor of the harshest winter encampment in the history of the United States military. He was twenty-two years old.

Post-war years

Politician and public servant
In 1783 the North Carolina General Assembly appointed Polk as Surveyor General of the Middle District, now a part of Tennessee. In this capacity Polk also acquired large tracts of land in the area. Twice he was elected to the House of Commons before returning in 1786 to his native Mecklenburg County. He was re-elected to the House of Commons in 1787, served a one-year term and was re-elected in 1790. He was a candidate for Speaker of the House in 1791, but was defeated by Stephen Cabarrus. That March President George Washington appointed him as Supervisor of Internal Revenue for the District of North Carolina, a position he held for seventeen years, or until the Internal Revenue Laws were repealed.

Polk was among the Continental Army officers who founded the North Carolina Society of the Cincinnati on October 23, 1783.

After the death of his first wife in 1799, Polk moved to property on Blount Street in Raleigh. In December of that year he was elected Grand Master of Masons of North Carolina and served in that office until December 1802.

Federalists in the state legislature nominated him for governor in 1802, but by a two-to-one margin he lost to John Baptista Ashe, a fellow officer in the Revolution. Ashe died before taking office.

Polk was appointed as the first president of the State Bank of North Carolina in 1811 and held that office for eight years.

In March 1812, as war with Britain seemed imminent, President Madison offered Polk a commission as brigadier in the U.S. Army. A Federalist and opponent of the war, he declined the offer. Not until August 1814, when the British sacked Washington, did he change his opposition to the war. Writing his brother-in-law William Hawkins, governor of North Carolina, he offered his services to the state in whatever capacity the governor saw fit. Inasmuch as North Carolina was not seriously threatened, he was not called upon.

In June 1818 Polk became one of the first vice presidents of Raleigh Auxiliary of the American Colonization Society, which sought to resettle free American blacks in a colony in West Africa. This colony developed as Liberia. Polk remained active in the group for many years.

The Federalists nominated him as candidate for governor in 1814, and again he was defeated.

Canova's Washington

After the War of 1812, the North Carolina legislature commissioned the celebrated sculptor Antonio Canova of Venice, Italy, to produce a statue of George Washington for the State House. On Christmas Eve 1821 it arrived in Raleigh and was met with great fanfare, including a 24-gun salute, marching bands, and a parade of both houses of the legislature and the governor. In last position, just ahead of the statue, were veterans of the Revolution, with Polk bearing the Stars and Stripes. Polk also gave a speech that day. The old State House building burned in June 1831 and the statue was destroyed. An accurate copy of the statue was produced in Italy from preserved molds in the 21st century and installed in the rotunda of the new Capitol building.

Lafayette's visit to Raleigh
Lafayette visited Raleigh in March 1825 as part of his Grand Tour of the United States. Colonel Polk was appointed to give an address on the occasion. After his speech, Polk and Lafayette embraced and wept in memory of what they had shared during the Revolution. Lafayette attended various balls, dinners, and other events, including breakfast at Colonel Polk's home on the morning of March 3.

Service to education
Polk was appointed as a trustee of the University of North Carolina in 1790 and served until his death, including a term as president of the trustees from 1802-1805. Among other educational efforts, he founded a school for sixteen pupils in Raleigh in 1827 and assisted his wife Sarah in founding a school for poor children in 1822.

Marriages and family
In October 1789 Polk married Grizelda Gilchrist, a granddaughter of a former colonial attorney general of North Carolina. She was born in Suffolk, Virginia, on October 24, 1768. The couple had two children, Thomas Gilchrist Polk, born February 22, 1791, and William Julius Polk, born March 21, 1793. Grizelda Polk died in 1799.

On New Year's Day 1801, Polk married Sarah Hawkins. Her brother William later was elected governor of North Carolina. Sarah bore thirteen children, two of whom died in infancy.

Notable relations
Thomas Polk, William's father. Continental Army General and member of the Congress of the Confederation. Considered the "Father of Charlotte (North Carolina)" by some.
Ezekiel Polk, his paternal uncle and first commanding officer during the Revolution.
James K. Polk, 11th President of the United States; William's first cousin, once removed, being the grandson of his father's brother Ezekiel.
Leonidas Polk, William's second son by his wife Sarah, was known as "The Fighting Bishop." An Episcopal bishop, he was commissioned as a Confederate general during the Civil War. (Killed in action at Pine Mountain, Tennessee.) He was instrumental in establishing the University of the South in Sewanee, Tennessee. Fort Polk is named in his honor.
Leonidas Lafayette Polk, great-great-grandson of William Polk, a Confederate colonel and first North Carolina Commissioner of Agriculture.
William Polk Hardeman Confederate Army General
George Polk Journalist murdered in 1948.

Death
Polk died on January 14, 1834, at his home in Raleigh.

His obituary in the January 21, 1834, issue of the Raleigh Register'' contained the following:

Legacy
The town of Polkville, North Carolina is named for him.
Polk County was named for him as he had property there.
Camp Polk, a World War I U.S. Army tank base in Raleigh, was named for him. 
The original Polk Prison was built in 1920 on the grounds of Camp Polk. The prison facility is named for Colonel William Polk. The North Carolina Museum of Art and its Museum Park now occupy the original site on Blue Ridge Road in Raleigh.
Polk Correctional Institution (originally Polk Youth Institution), opened in 1997 near Butner, North Carolina, is a North Carolina maximum-security prison for men aged 19–25.

David Swain, the governor of North Carolina at the time of Polk's death, said:

Notes

References 

 (Microfilm of original newspaper provided by The Olivia Raney Local History Library, Wake County Public Libraries, Raleigh North Carolina.)

External links

1758 births
1834 deaths
Continental Army officers from North Carolina
People from Mecklenburg County, North Carolina
Members of the North Carolina House of Representatives
William
Burials at City Cemetery (Raleigh, North Carolina)
North Carolina Federalists